Titus Clodius Vibius Varus was a Roman senator who was ordinary consul in AD 160 as the colleague of Appius Annius Atilius Bradua. A bull offering was made to the goddess Cybele for the health of Emperor Antoninus Pius and for the preservation of the Colonia Copia Felix Munatia (now Lyon) on the fifth of December in the year of Vibius' consulate.

In his monograph on naming practices of the first centuries of the Imperial period, Olli Salomies writes confidently that Varus was the son of Titus Vibius Varus, ordinary consul of 134. The scholar also suggests that the gentilicum Clodius and the presence of the uncommon praenomen Titus may indicate his mother was a Clodia, that is a female member of the gens Clodius.

References

Epigraphs
 
 

2nd-century Romans
Imperial Roman consuls
Vibius Varus, Titus
Vibii